Black Jack is a type of "aniseed flavour chew" according to its packaging. It is a chewy confectionery. Black Jack is manufactured under the Tangerine Confectionery Barratt brand in Spain and the UK. In the 1920s Trebor Bassett manufactured them, and the wrapper showed gollywogs on it. An example of it can be seen at the Museum of Brands.

Ingredients
The recipe has varied over the years. In 2021 the ingredients were:

Glucose syrup, Sugar, Palm Oil, Colour (Vegetable Carbon), Hydrolysed Pea Protein, Citric Acid, Aniseed Oil, Acidity Regulator (Trisodium citrate).

Each 250g pack contains 46 chews.

See also
 Fruit Salad

References

Yorkshire cuisine
Brand name confectionery
British confectionery
Anise
Candy